Jews for Jesus is an international Christian missionary organization headquartered in San Francisco, California which is affiliated with the Messianic Jewish religious movement. The group is known for its proselytism to Jews and promotes the belief that Jesus is the Christ and the Son of God. It was founded in 1970 by Moishe Rosen, as Hineni Ministries, before being incorporated under its current name in 1973.

There are no Jewish religious authorities which consider Jews for Jesus to be a Jewish organization. Rabbinic Jewish authorities point out that the Messianic Jewish group refers exclusively to Christian dogma in its "Statement of Faith".  Additionally, the Supreme Court of Israel determined that Messianic Jews are not actually Jews, as belief in Jesus as the Messiah is not a Jewish value. Instead, most Jews view Jesus as a false prophet and a failed messiah claimant.

History 
Jews for Jesus was founded by Moishe Rosen, a Baptist minister of the Hebrew Christian movement and a former member of the American Board of Missions to the Jews (ABMJ). The organization was formed in 1970 under the name "Hineni Ministries" as a subsidiary group of the ABMJ. In 1973, Rosen left ABMJ and incorporated his ministry as a 501(c)3 non-profit organization under the name "Jews for Jesus". Originally, "Jews for Jesus" was one of the organization's several slogans, but after the media began to call the group "Jews for Jesus", the organization adopted the name.

Rosen and members began conducting community outreach on streets and college campuses of San Francisco, California. In the following years, branches were established in New York, Chicago, and Boston. In 1978, the Jews for Jesus headquarters relocated to its current location in San Francisco. In 1981, the organization expanded internationally. According to the organization, as of 2021, they maintain offices in 13 countries and 15 cities around the world.

Rosen remained Executive Director until 1996, when he stepped down to work full-time as a staff missionary. He was replaced by David Brickner, who has held the position since. Rosen remained on the Board of Directors until his death in 2010.

Beliefs 

Jews for Jesus claims to synthesize Jewish heritage and Christian faith in spiritual harmony. They believe faith in Jesus is a viable expression of Jewish life.

The organization summarizes its beliefs in a statement of faith:
 The Old Testament and the New Testament are divinely inspired, without error, and are the final authority in all matters of faith and life. Traditional Jewish literature is in no way binding upon life or faith but of value only where it is supported by or conformable to the Word of God.
 There is one sovereign God, existing in three persons: Father, Son, and Holy Spirit. They believe that this concept is rooted in Judaism.
 Mankind was created in the image of God, but due to sin has been separated from God.
 Jesus is the Messiah and died for the sin of mankind as a substitutionary sacrifice. All who believe in Him have salvation.
 The Church is an elect people in accordance with the New Covenant, comprising both Jews and Gentiles who acknowledge Jesus as Messiah and Redeemer.
 Jesus will return personally in order to consummate the prophesied purposes concerning His kingdom.
 The bodily resurrection of the just and the unjust, the everlasting blessedness of the saved and the everlasting conscious punishment of the lost.

Operations 
Jews for Jesus is a registered 501(c)(3) organization that employs approximately 250 staff worldwide. Its headquarters are located in San Francisco, California, and operates offices in New York City, Los Angeles, Toronto, Sydney, Johannesburg, London, Berlin, Paris, Budapest, Tel Aviv, Kiev, Odessa, Moscow, and Jerusalem.

Once well-known for their distribution of hand-drawn religious tracts, today Jews for Jesus conducts community engagement through other means. Examples of their outreach methods include Jewish holiday events, Bible studies, service projects, internet evangelism, and multi-purpose spaces such as the Moishe Rosen Center in Tel Aviv and the Upside Down Cafe in Los Angeles.

Funding and organization 
Jews for Jesus’ income comes primarily from Christian donors. The nonprofit’s annual income breakdown consists of 87% individual support, 5% miscellaneous revenue, 5% congregational support, and 3% congregational offerings. Their annual expenditures consist of 77% outreach, 12% administration, and 11% fundraising. According to the Evangelical Council for Financial Accountability, the group's total income in FY 2018 was US$24,767,732 and its total assets were $39,596,245.

They are a charter member of the Evangelical Council for Financial Accountability and of MissioNexus. Donations are tax deductible. An independent auditing firm, Eckhoff Accountancy, conducts the organization’s annual audit.

Jews for Jesus is governed by international boards of directors in the United States, Canada, South Africa, Australia, Israel, and Europe. The CEO, currently David Brickner, is advised by an executive leadership team consisting of seven members.

Public perception

Jewish 
Jews for Jesus has a contentious relationship with the Jewish community, and their methods have generated controversy. All Jewish authorities, as well as the governing bodies of the State of Israel, hold the view that Messianic Judaism, the religious movement which Jews for Jesus is affiliated with, is not a sect of Judaism but a form of Evangelical Christianity. Additionally, Gentiles who convert to Messianic Judaism are not recognized as Jewish by any Jewish sect. However, Jews for Jesus says they "cannot support any efforts by Gentile believers to convert to any type of Judaism."

Belief in Jesus as deity, Son of God, or even a non-divine Christ/Messiah or prophet (as in Islam), is held as incompatible with Judaism by most Jewish religious movements. However, there has been some debate of that point by Jewish scholars. Daniel Boyarin, a Jewish historian of religion and professor of Talmudic culture at UC Berkeley, writes in one of his books: Most (if not all) of the ideas and practices of the Jesus movement of the first century and the beginning of the second century—and even later—can be safely understood as part of the ideas and practices that we understand to be "Judaism."... The ideas of Trinity and incarnation, or certainly the germs of those ideas, were already present among Jewish believers well before Jesus came on the scene to incarnate in himself, as it were, those theological notions and take up his messianic calling.Dan Cohn-Sherbok, a rabbi of Reform Judaism and professor of Jewish Theology at the University of Wales, implies that Messianic Judaism should be embraced in the Jewish community:...the non-Orthodox rejection of Messianic Jews is more difficult to comprehend given the multidimensional character of contemporary Jewish life ... There is simply no consensus among non-Orthodox Jews concerning the central tenets of the faith, nor is there any agreement about Jewish observance. Instead, the various branches of non-Orthodox Judaism embrace a totally heterogeneous range of viewpoints ... in my view Messianic Judaism constitutes an innovative, exciting, and extremely interesting development on the Jewish scene.In a 2013 Pew Forum study, 60% of American Jews said that belief in Jesus as the Messiah was not "compatible with being Jewish", while 34% found it compatible and 4% did not know. A 2017 survey that included Messianic Jews "found that 21 percent of Jewish millennials believe Jesus was 'God in human form who lived among people in the 1st century.'" An additional question on faith in the survey found that 14% of participants identified with Christianity, and 10% believed in a hybrid of Christian and Jewish beliefs.

In 1993 the Task Force on Missionaries and Cults of the Jewish Community Relations Council of New York (JCRCNY) issued a statement which has been endorsed by the four major Jewish denominations: Orthodox Judaism, Conservative Judaism, Reform Judaism, and Reconstructionist Judaism, as well as national Jewish organizations. Based on this statement, the Spiritual Deception Prevention Project at the JCRCNY stated:

The director of counter-missionary group Torah Atlanta, Rabbi Efraim Davidson, stated: "Jews for Jesus use aggressive proselytizing to target disenfranchised or unaffiliated Jews, Russian immigrants and college students," and that "their techniques are manipulative, deceptive and anti-Semitic."

Christian 
Some Western Christians object to evangelizing Jews because they see Jewish religious practice as valid in and of itself. Some Liberal Protestant denominations have issued statements criticizing evangelism of Jews including the United Church of Christ and the Presbyterian Church USA, which said in 1988 that Jews have their own covenant with God. The Board of Governors of the Long Island Council of Churches opposes proselytizing, and voiced their sentiments in a statement that "noted with alarm" the "subterfuge and dishonesty" inherent in the "mixing [of] religious symbols in ways which distort their essential meaning," and named Jews for Jesus as one of the three groups about whom such behavior was alleged.

Leighton Ford, former vice president of the Billy Graham Evangelical Association and current president of Leighton Ford Ministries, supports the work of Jews for Jesus:The first followers of Jesus were all Jews – women and men so touched and changed by him that they had to tell their friends and neighbors ... Like their first century counterparts, the people I know in Jews for Jesus have good news they share lovingly and boldly!In 2003, the sponsorship of Jews for Jesus by All Souls Church, Langham Place, a conservative evangelical church in London, including a launch event on Rosh Hashanah to start a UK mission targeting the Jewish community, led to the Interfaith Alliance UK, a coalition of Jewish, Christian and Islamic religious leaders, issuing a letter of protest to the Archbishop of Canterbury.

Other 
The InterFaith Conference of Metropolitan Washington includes Muslims, Jews, and Christian groups. The Conference states that they "support the right of all religions to share their message in the spirit of good will"; however, Rev. Clark Lobenstine has condemned the "proselytizing efforts" of "Jews for Jesus and other messianic Jewish groups." His wording matched the Conference's 1987 "Statement on Proselytism", which makes claims against "groups that have adopted the label of Hebrew Christianity, Messianic Judaism, or Jews for Jesus", so it is unclear which claims are directed at Jews for Jesus in particular.

America's Religions. An Educator's Guide to Beliefs and Practices contains "[a] note about Jews for Jesus, Messianic Jews, Hebrew Christians, and similar groups: Jews in these groups who have converted to Christianity but continue to observe various Jewish practices are no longer considered part of the Jewish community in the usual sense".

Several other organizations oppose the identification of Jews for Jesus as a Jewish group.

Controversies

1987 – Freedom of speech 
In Board of Airport Commissioners of Los Angeles v. Jews for Jesus, Inc. the Supreme Court unanimously ruled in favor of Jews for Jesus in a free speech case against the Los Angeles International Airport.

1998 and 2005–2006 – Online name 
Jews for Jesus has been involved in litigation regarding Internet use of its name. In 1998 they sued Steven Brodsky for cybersquatting—registering the domain name jewsforjesus.org for a site criticizing the organization. The domain now belongs to Jews for Jesus and is used for their main site.

In 2005 Jews for Jesus sued Google for allowing a Blogspot user to put up a site at the third-level subdomain jewsforjesus.blogspot.com. In September 2006 Christianity Today reported: "Jews for Jesus settled out of court with a critical blogger identified as 'Whistle Blower' on jewsforjesus.blogspot.com. The evangelistic ministry assumed control of the site."

2006 – misuse of Jackie Mason name 
In 2006 comedian and actor Jackie Mason filed a lawsuit against Jews for Jesus, alleging that they unlawfully distributed a pamphlet which used his name and likeness in a way that suggested he was a member of the group. Jackie Mason was Jewish and not associated with Jews for Jesus. Jews for Jesus issued a detailed response to the allegation on their website.

A judge of the United States District Court for the Southern District of New York denied a preliminary injunction against Jews for Jesus over the pamphlet, finding the distribution of the pamphlet to be protected by the First Amendment, and also stated that the pamphlet did not suggest that Mason was a Christian.

In December 2006, Mason dropped the lawsuit against Jews for Jesus after they issued a letter of apology to him. The group's executive director, David Brickner, stated in the letter to Mason that he wanted "to convey my sincere apologies for any distress that you felt over our tract." Brickner continued that he believed its publication was protected by the Constitution, but the group was willing in the interest of peace and love for Israel to retire the pamphlet. Mason replied in front of the federal court in Manhattan where he accepted the apology, "There's no such thing as a Jew for Jesus. It's like saying a black man is for the KKK. You can't be a table and a chair. You're either a Jew or a Gentile."

That Jew Died for You video 
In 2014, Jews for Jesus published a three-minute YouTube video called That Jew Died for You, to coincide with Passover, Holy Week and Holocaust Remembrance Day on 28 April. A long-haired Jesus dragging a large wooden cross appears in the film until an Auschwitz concentration camp guard sends him to the gas chambers and says "just another Jew" in German. Jews for Jesus said that the objective of the film was for Jesus to be identified with the victims rather than the perpetrators of the Holocaust and that "the Holocaust has been used – perhaps more than any other event or topic – to prevent Jewish people from considering the good news of Jesus." Jay Michaelson, writing in The Jewish Daily Forward, described it as "the most tasteless YouTube video ever" and wrote: "Not to state the obvious, but it desecrates the memory of six million Jews to use their suffering as a way to convert Jews to Christianity." Fox News Channel and History refused to play an advertisement for the film.

References in popular culture 
 
 Airplane! (1980 film), 1980
 The New Yorker, 25 October 2004. Roz Chast.
 Moral Orel (2005-2012 Adult Swim animated series)
 
 Esquire magazine, 2014.
 Curb Your Enthusiasm, 2021.

See also 
 Michael L. Brown
 Jews for Judaism
 Messianic Judaism
 Tovia Singer

References

Further reading
 Called to Controversy: The Unlikely Story of Moishe Rosen and the Founding of Jews for Jesus by Ruth Rosen (Thomas Nelson, 2012) 
 Not ashamed: The story of Jews for Jesus by Ruth Tucker (Multnomah Publishers, 2000) 
 Sentenced for Life: A Story of an Entry and an Exit into the World of Fundamentalist Christianity and Jews for Jesus by Jo Ann Schneider Farris (Writers Club Press, 2002) 
 Messianic Judaism: A rabbi's journey through religious change in America by Carol Harris-Shapiro (Beacon Press, 1999) 
 Evangelizing the Chosen People: Missions to the Jews in America, 1880–2000 by Yaakov Ariel (The University of North Carolina Press, 1999) 
 Hawking God. A Young Jewish Woman's Ordeal in Jews for Jesus by Ellen Kamentsky (Sapphire Press, 1993) An excerpt
 Jews for Jesus: An Anthropological Study by Juliene G. Lipson (AMS Press, 1990) 
 Smashing the Idols: A Jewish Inquiry into the Cult Phenomenon by Gary D. Eisenberg (Jason Aronson, 1988)

External links 
 Official website
 Can a Jew believe in Jesus? – a critical article about Jews for Jesus

 
Christian organizations established in 1970
Christian organizations established in 1973
Christianity and Judaism related controversies
Christian missionary societies
Evangelical missionary societies
Messianic Judaism
Conversion of Jews to Christianity